The 154th Division() was created in November 1948 under the Regulation of the Redesignations of All Organizations and Units of the Army, issued by Central Military Commission on November 1, 1948, basing on the 2nd Independent Division of Northeastern People's Liberation Army,  formed in September.

The division was a part of 41st Corps. Under the flag of 154th division it took part in the Chinese civil war. In June 1951 the division was disbanded. Its divisional HQ became HQ of 49th Corps, then 3rd Air Force Corps.

As of disbandment the division was composed of:
460th Regiment;
461st Regiment;
462nd Regiment.

References

Infantry divisions of the People's Liberation Army
Military units and formations established in 1948
Military units and formations disestablished in 1951